The 1918 Toronto anti-Greek riot was a three-day race riot in Toronto, Ontario, Canada, targeting Greek immigrants during August 2–4, 1918. (Some sources indicate the date range August 1–5, to include the event that triggered the violence and the date of the final restoration of the peace.) It was the largest riot in the city's history and one of the largest anti-Greek riots in the world. In the newspapers of the time the events were referred to as the Toronto troubles. The riots were the result of prejudice against new immigrants and the false beliefs that Greeks were not fighting in World War I, and that they were pro-German.

The riots were triggered by news about the expulsion of a disabled veteran, Private Claude Cludernay, from the Greek-owned White City Café on Thursday evening, August 1. Cludernay was drunk and belligerent and struck a waiter, who ejected him and called police. Although the event was insignificant, it sparked indignation, and violence started on Friday, August 2, when crowds estimated at 5,000–20,000 persons, led by World War I army veterans, looted and destroyed every visibly Greek business in the city center, while the overwhelmed police could not prevent this and just stood by and watched. Due to the scope of the violence, the city mayor had to invoke the Riot Act to call in the militia and military police. On Saturday night, the police and militia were engaged in fierce battles downtown attempting to stop the violence. In total, an estimated 50,000 on both sides took part in the riot. Over 20 restaurants were attacked, with damages estimated at more than $1,000,000 in modern (as of 2010) values.

After the events, Greek community leaders issued an official statement stating that they support the Allied cause. They stated that those who were naturalized were joining the Canadian army and that there were more than 2,000 Greeks in the Canadian Expeditionary Force (C.E.F.) with many from Toronto, and at least five Toronto Greeks had been killed while serving with the C.E.F, and ten incapacitated. Additionally, at least 135 Toronto Greeks had returned home to join the Greek army against the Central Powers.

Many Greek families abandoned the Yonge Street area after the riots, eventually forming a new Greek neighbourhood further east along Danforth Avenue.

The riots echoed incidents in the United States where Greek immigrants were attacked and displaced by mobs and even the Ku Klux Klan. The Greek diaspora responded with overt demonstrations of patriotism, such as buying large amounts of war bonds during World War II and changing their names to make them more familiar to North American ears.

See also
 Greek Canadians in the Greater Toronto Area
Christie Pits riot (1933)
Jubilee riots (1875)
Greek Town Riot
Anti-Greek pogrom of 1937

References

Persecution of Greeks in North America
Race riots in Canada
Canadian people of Greek descent
1918 in Ontario
1910s in Toronto
August 1918 events
1918 crimes in Canada
Anti-Greek sentiment
Riots and civil disorder in Canada
Greek-Canadian culture
Racism in Canada
History of Toronto
Crime in Toronto
Anti-Greek pogroms